Quedara is a genus of grass skipper butterflies in the family Hesperiidae. The genus was erected by Charles Swinhoe in 1919.

Species
Listed alphabetically:
Quedara albifascia (Moore, 1878) – Myanmar, Laos
Quedara basiflava (de Nicéville, [1889]) – endemic to Western Ghats, India
Quedara flavens Devyatkin, 2000 – northern Vietnam, southern Yunnan
Quedara inornata (Elwes & Edwards, 1897) – Borneo
Quedara monteithi (Wood-Mason & de Nicéville, [1887]) – dubious flitter – Malaya
Quedara singularis (Mabille, 1893)

Biology
The larvae feed on Palmae including Calamus, Daemonorops, Eugeissona,

References

Hesperiinae
Hesperiidae genera